Ice moon may refer to:

 A full moon in January or February
 A natural satellite composed primarily of ice (whether water or other substance like nitrogen)